Turbhe is suburb of Navi Mumbai. Turbhe Suburb is known for the presence of  Wholesale  Agriculture Market also Known as Mumbai-APMC Market Turbhe.  which attracts sellers from Maharashtra & Gujrat. Turbhe is aligned with Sion-Panvel highway & Thane-Belapur Road. It has midpoint of both highways. Turbhe stores's market ( Jananta Market) is known as wholesale market for all automobile, industry  and mechanical parts & Instruments.

The language spoken by people is Agari ( Marathi ) . Turbhe also have one of oldest lake known as Ramtanu mata lake in sector -22 . On Ananth Chaturthi, Dassera, and Ram Navami its most crowded place. All over from Vashi, Sanpada, Juinagar, and KoperKhainre Ganpati Bappa's Visarjan and Navratri Devi visarjan takes place in this lake. The festival of Ram Navami annual carnival around lake is worth watching.

Turbhe Railway Station is the fifth station on the Thane / Vashi and Thane / Panvel railway line, starting from Thane.

The NMMT has a depot at Turbhe.

Education Institutes in Turbhe 

 K. Bholenath Ramdas Patil School
 Panchshil Public School
 Arambh Gyan Vikas Kendra
 Navjeevan Vidyalaya
 Alhasnat Primary School
 Anjuman Islam High School

References 

Cities and towns in Thane district
Navi Mumbai